Hazlitt is both a surname and a given name. Notable people with the name include:

 Gerry Hazlitt (1888–1915), Australian cricketer
 Henry Hazlitt (1894–1993), libertarian philosopher, economics writer, and journalist
 John Hazlitt (1767–1837), English artist
 William Hazlitt (Unitarian minister) (1737–1820), Unitarian minister and author
 William Hazlitt (1778–1830), English literary critic and essayist
 William Hazlitt (registrar) (1811–1893), English writer, translator, and registrar
 William Carew Hazlitt (1834–1913), English bibliographer, editor, writer, and lawyer
 Frederick Hazlitt Brennan (1901–1962), American screenwriter

Fictional characters:
 Seth Hazlitt